WBES-TV was an early UHF television station in Buffalo, New York. The station operated on channel 59 from studios in the Hotel Lafayette in Buffalo. WBES-TV, the second UHF station (and third TV station overall) in Western New York, was very short-lived, signing on September 29, 1953 and shutting down for the last time on December 19 of the same year. An independent station for its entire existence, WBES-TV was plagued by technical and financial problems, the primary factor in the station's failure. Channel 59 was never reissued; it would not be used again in Western New York until being reallocated to Rochester, New York station WHAM-TV, where it was used as the temporary digital channel prior to the digital television transition.

WBES-TV has occasionally been erroneously listed as being on channel 56 or 58, two channels that were later issued to other licensees, both low-power stations: 56 became WBXZ-LP, a station operated as of 2015 by Steven Ritchie. Channel 58, last known as WFHW-LP, has also gone silent.

Channels 52 through 69 were removed entirely from broadcast television use soon after the 2009 completion of US DTV transition.

After WBES-TV was shut down, Buffalo was left with two stations, market leader WBEN-TV (channel 4) and fellow UHF upstart WBUF-TV (channel 17); WGR-TV (channel 2) signed on for the very first time on August 14, 1954, using WBES-TV's broadcast tower.

External links
History of UHF Television in Buffalo
History of Television in Buffalo

BES-TV
Television channels and stations established in 1953
1953 disestablishments in New York (state)
Defunct television stations in the United States
1953 establishments in New York (state)
Television channels and stations disestablished in 1953
BES-TV